Dasmond Koh (born 22 February 1972) is a Singaporean actor, television host, radio DJ and businessman. He was a full-time Mediacorp artiste from 1995 to 2015. In 2015, He left Mediacorp to concentrate on NoonTalk Media which he co-founded in 2011.

Career
Prior to entering the entertainment industry, Koh had been a full-time deejay with YES 933 since 1996. He was one of the RCS's most popular Chinese language deejays and was voted Friday Weekly Singapore'''s "Most Popular DJ" five years in a row and YES 933's most popular DJ for three consecutive years at the biennial RCS Golden Mike Awards.

In 2000 Koh joined MediaCorp while still juggling DJ duties and eventually resigned to join MediaCorp full-time several years later. Although fairly new to television, he was voted the Most Popular Newcomer at the Star Awards 2000 after starring in the sitcom Soho @ Work. He has hosted a variety of programmes ranging from travelogues to variety shows and major "live" events such as the Chingay Parade, Star Awards and SuperBand. Since crossing over to television, he has also enjoyed success as a host. He was voted the "Top 10 Most Popular Male Artistes" for the tenth time at the Star Awards 2019 and has been nominated for Best Variety Show Host and Best Info-Ed Show Host several times.

In 2012 he co-directed his first film Timeless Love.

In 2015, Koh left the entertainment industry and announced that he would not renew his Mediacorp contract due to him setting up a business entity. He co-founded an anti-aging skincare and beauty products company known as FrozenAge. Currently, he is the co-host of The Sheng Siong Show'', together with Kym Ng and Seow Sin Nee.

Personal life
Koh was educated at Anglican High School and Temasek Polytechnic. In 2002, he was an Ambassador for World Vision and sponsored 2 Mongolian children.

Filmography

Television

Film

Variety show

Radio hosting

Compilation album

Awards and nominations

References

External links
Personal Portfolio
Profile on LinkedIn

Singaporean television personalities
Singaporean DJs
1972 births
Living people
Singaporean people of Chinese descent
Singaporean businesspeople